The Lightweight Encryption Algorithm (also known as LEA) is a 128-bit block cipher developed by South Korea in 2013 to provide confidentiality in high-speed environments such as big data and cloud computing, as well as lightweight environments such as IoT devices and mobile devices. LEA has three different key lengths: 128, 192, and 256 bits. LEA encrypts data about 1.5 to 2 times faster than AES, the most widely used block cipher in various software environments.

LEA is one of the cryptographic algorithms approved by the Korean Cryptographic Module Validation Program (KCMVP) and is the national standard of Republic of Korea (KS X 3246). LEA is included in the ISO/IEC 29192-2:2019 standard (Information security - Lightweight cryptography - Part 2: Block ciphers).

Specification 

LEA with a 128-bit key, LEA with a 192-bit key, and LEA with a 256-bit key are referred to as “LEA-128”, “LEA-192”, and “LEA-256”, respectively.
The number of rounds is 24 for LEA-128, 28 for LEA-192, and 32 for LEA-256.

Encryption

Let  be 192-bit round keys, where  are 32-bit blocks.
Here  is the number of rounds for the LEA algorithm.
The encryption operation is described as follows:

 

Decryption

The decryption operation is as follows:
 
 for  down to

Key schedule 

The key schedule of LEA supports 128, 192, and 256-bit keys and outputs 192-bit round keys  for the data processing part.

Key schedule for LEA-128 

Let  be a 128-bit key, where  are 32-bit blocks.
The key schedule for LEA-128 takes  and four 32-bit constants  as inputs and outputs twenty-four 192-bit round keys .
The key schedule operation for LEA-128 is as follows:
 

Key schedule for LEA-192 
Let  be a 192-bit key, where  are 32-bit blocks.
The key schedule for LEA-192 takes  and six 32-bit constants  as inputs and outputs twenty-eight 192-bit round keys .
The key schedule operation for LEA-192 is as follows:
 

Key schedule for LEA-256 
Let  be a 256-bit key, where  are 32-bit blocks.
The key schedule for LEA-192 takes  and eight 32-bit constants  as inputs and outputs thirty-two 192-bit round keys .
The key schedule operation for LEA-256 is as follows:
 

Constant values 
The eight 32-bit constant values  used in the key schedule are given in the following table.

Security 

As of 2019, no successful attack on full-round LEA is known.
As is typical for iterated block ciphers, reduced-round variants have been attacked.
The best published attacks on LEA in the standard attack model (CPA/CCA with unknown key) are boomerang attacks and differential linear attacks.
The security margin to the whole rounds ratio is greater than 37% against various existing cryptanalytic techniques for block ciphers.

Performance 

LEA has very good performance in a general-purpose software environment.
In particular, it is possible to encrypt at a rate of about 1.5 to 2 times on average, compared to AES, the most widely used block cipher in various software environments.
The tables below compare the performance of LEA and AES using FELICS (Fair Evaluation of Lightweight Cryptographic Systems), a benchmarking framework for evaluation of software implementations of lightweight cryptographic primitives.

Test vectors 

Test vectors for LEA for each key length are as follows.
All values are expressed in hexadecimal form.

 LEA-128
 Key:  0f 1e 2d 3c 4b 5a 69 78 87 96 a5 b4 c3 d2 e1 f0 
 Plaintext:  10 11 12 13 14 15 16 17 18 19 1a 1b 1c 1d 1e 1f 
 Ciphertext:  9f c8 4e 35 28 c6 c6 18 55 32 c7 a7 04 64 8b fd 
 LEA-192
 Key:  0f 1e 2d 3c 4b 5a 69 78 87 96 a5 b4 c3 d2 e1 f0 f0 e1 d2 c3 b4 a5 96 87 
 Plaintext:  20 21 22 23 24 25 26 27 28 29 2a 2b 2c 2d 2e 2f 
 Ciphertext:  6f b9 5e 32 5a ad 1b 87 8c dc f5 35 76 74 c6 f2 
 LEA-256
 Key:  0f 1e 2d 3c 4b 5a 69 78 87 96 a5 b4 c3 d2 e1 f0 f0 e1 d2 c3 b4 a5 96 87 78 69 5a 4b 3c 2d 1e 0f 
 Plaintext:  30 31 32 33 34 35 36 37 38 39 3a 3b 3c 3d 3e 3f 
 Ciphertext:  d6 51 af f6 47 b1 89 c1 3a 89 00 ca 27 f9 e1 97

Implementations 

LEA is free for any use: public or private, commercial or non-commercial.
The source code for distribution of LEA implemented in C, Java, and Python can be downloaded from KISA's website.
In addition, LEA is contained in Crypto++ library, a free C++ class library of cryptographic schemes.

KCMVP 

LEA is one of the cryptographic algorithms approved by the Korean Cryptographic Module Validation Program (KCMVP).

Standardization 

LEA is included in the following standards.

 KS X 3246, 128-bit block cipher LEA (in Korean)

 ISO/IEC 29192-2:2019, Information security - Lightweight cryptography - Part 2: Block ciphers

References 

Block ciphers